List of metropolitan areas in Venezuela according to the Instituto Nacional de Estadistica (2013).

Metropolitan areas

References 

 
Venezuela
Metropolitan areas
Cities in Venezuela